Tengusawanuma Dam is an earthfill dam located in Akita Prefecture in Japan. The dam is used for irrigation. The catchment area of the dam is 78.6 km2. The dam impounds about 2  ha of land when full and can store 130 thousand cubic meters of water. The construction of the dam was started on 1928 and completed in 1932.

References

Dams in Akita Prefecture
1932 establishments in Japan